The B class were a class of diesel locomotives built by Commonwealth Engineering for the Western Australian Government Railways between 1962 and 1965.

History
The first five B class units entered service in 1962. Three years later, a second batch of five was delivered. 

The second batch differed from the first only in having sloping cab sides, to enable the second batch to pass underneath the limited clearance cranes on the Fremantle wharves.

All members of the class spent the whole of their working lives in the Perth metropolitan area, and were written off as a group in September 1984. Some of them have since been preserved.

References

Further reading

Commonwealth Engineering locomotives
Diesel-hydraulic locomotives of Australia
Diesel locomotives of Western Australia
Railway locomotives introduced in 1962
0-6-0 locomotives
3 ft 6 in gauge locomotives of Australia
Diesel-electric locomotives of Australia